Virginia's 1st House of Delegates district is one of 100 seats in the Virginia House of Delegates, the lower house of the state's bicameral legislature. District 1 represents the city of Norton and portions of Lee, Scott, and Wise counties. The seat is held by Republican Terry Kilgore. Kilgore has been in office since 1993.

Elections

2017
In the November 2017 election, Democrat Alicia Kallen ran against Kilgore. It was the first time in a decade Kilgore had a challenger for the seat. Kallen, 26, works at Norton Community Hospital. However, she was unable to win the seat and Kilgore kept his position.

District officeholders

Electoral history

References

1
Norton, Virginia
Lee County, Virginia
Scott County, Virginia
Wise County, Virginia